Mickleham Road is a secondary road located in Victoria, Australia, north of Melbourne.

Route
Mickleham Road begins at an intersection with Donnybrook Road and Old Sydney Road in Mickleham, and continues south as a two-lane single-carriageway through Yuroke to the intersection with Somerton Road in Greenvale, widening to a four-lane dual-carriageway road and continues south through Attwood to a large roundabout intersection with Broadmeadows Road in Westmeadows. It widens to a six-lane dual-carriageway road through the suburbs of Gladstone Park and under the Tullamarine Freeway, narrowing back to a four-lane dual-carriageway road until reaching the intersection with Melrose Drive in Tullamarine, where it becomes Broadmeadows Road (which continues south to Sharps Road).

History
Mickleham Road was signed as Metropolitan Route 39 between Craigieburn Road in Yuroke and Melrose Drive in Tullamarine, in 1989. With Victoria's conversion to the newer alphanumeric system in the late 1990s, the section between Mickleham and Greenvale was replaced by C739.

The passing of the Road Management Act 2004 granted the responsibility of overall management and development of Victoria's major arterial roads to VicRoads: in 2004, VicRoads re-declared Mickleham Road (Arterial #5820) from Donnybrook Road in Mickleham to Melrose Drive in Tullamarine.

Major intersections
Mickleham Road is entirely contained within the City of Hume local government area.

See also

References

Streets in Melbourne
Transport in the City of Hume